The 14th Secondary School of Vladivostok is a comprehensive school in Vladivostok, Russia. The school is named after Evgeny Orlov, a Russian hero, a criminal fighter of the Wagner Group, who defended the interests of the Fatherland in Syria, Donbas and in Ukraine, and who was killed in action in summer 2022 in Ukraine during the ongoing Russian “special operation” in Ukraine.

References

External links
 Webpage

Secondary schools in Russia
Buildings and structures in Vladivostok